ELPA or elpa may refer to:

Organisations
 Elliniki Leschi Periigiseon kai Aftokinitou, the Automobile and Touring Club of Greece 
 ELPA Rally, a former rally competition in Greece
 European Liver Patients Association, founded by The Hepatitis C Trust
 European Law & Policy Advisory Group; See Ernest Valko
 EuroLeague Players Association

Other uses
 Emacs Lisp Package Archive, for GNU Emacs

See also
 3. elpa, an album by Gustavo 
 English Language Proficiency Assessment for the 21st Century (ELPA21), part of CRESST at UCLA